Maitland Telephone Museum is a museum in Maitland, Orange County, Florida. It is operated by the Maitland Historical Society. The museum covers the history and development of the Winter Park Telephone Company. It is located at 221 West Packwood Avenue.

See also
List of museums in Florida

Links
Telephone Museum website

Museums in Orange County, Florida
Telecommunications museums in the United States
Maitland, Florida